The 1904–05 Scottish Division One season was won by Celtic. They and Rangers had finished the league campaign level on 41 points, and a play-off at Hampden Park (doubling up as a fixture in the minor Glasgow Football League) was arranged to decide the championship. An English-based referee was drafted in to officiate at the match due to increasing tensions between the two groups of supporters and controversies in recent matches between the sides. Celtic won 2–1, with Jimmy McMenemy and Davie Hamilton scoring the decisive goals.

The 'Old firm' clubs (a term recently employed for the growing commercial draw of the frequent fixtures between them) had already been involved in two other unusual matches during that season: 
The pivotal New Year's Day fixture at Ibrox had to be abandoned in the second half – the unexpectedly large crowd in attendance (estimated at 70,000) was cleared from the pitch to allow play to start, but spectators continued to spill on at regular intervals, with the contemporary report noting that "the game assumed a farcical order" as a result. the match was eventually played to a conclusion on 18 February 1905, with Celtic winning 4–1.
The Scottish Cup semi-final between the clubs, played at Celtic Park on 25 March, was abandoned on 80 minutes with Rangers two goals ahead when supporters invaded the field and confronted the referee after Celtic striker Jimmy Quinn had been sent off for violent conduct. The opponent he was accused of kicking, Alex Craig, offered a statement exonerating Quinn but the Scottish Football Association imposed a one-month ban – however, Celtic had already completed all their league fixtures, and by the time of the play-off Quinn had served the ban and took part in the match.

League table

Results

Championship play-off

Teams

See also
1890–91 Scottish Football League#Championship play-off

References

 
 

1904–05 Scottish Football League
Scottish Division One seasons
Scottish